Czechoslovakia competed at the 1960 Winter Olympics in Squaw Valley, United States.

Medalists

Cross-country skiing

Men

Figure skating

Men

Women

Ice hockey

Group C 
Top two teams (shaded ones) from each group advanced to the final round and played for 1st-6th places, other teams played in the consolation round.

USA 7-5 Czechoslovakia
Czechoslovakia 18-1 Australia

Final round 

USSR 8-5 Czechoslovakia
Canada 4-0 Czechoslovakia
Czechoslovakia 3-1 Sweden
Czechoslovakia 9-1 Germany (UTG)
USA 9-4 Czechoslovakia

Leading scorers

Nordic combined 

Events:
 normal hill ski jumping (Three jumps, best two counted and shown here.)
 15 km cross-country skiing

References
Official Olympic Reports
International Olympic Committee results database
 Olympic Winter Games 1960, full results by sports-reference.com

Nations at the 1960 Winter Olympics
1960
Winter Olympics